Richard Nader (1940–2009) was a disk jockey and the entertainment promoter who pushed the concept of oldies mainstream, beginning with his first Rock and Roll Revival concert October 18, 1969, featuring Chuck Berry, The Platters, Bill Haley and the Comets (performing in the United States for the first time in over a decade), The Shirelles, The Coasters, Jimmy Clanton, and Sha Na Na.

Nader began as a disc jockey in high school, continuing in Korea over Armed Forces Radio while in the U.S. Army.

He joined the Premier Talent Agency where he arranged bookings for The Who, The Animals, Herman and his Hermits, The Beau Brummels, and The Crazy World Of Arthur Brown. Frustrated with the British Invasion's impact on many of the artists he promoted, he left in order to begin promoting concerts featuring acts from the fifteen years of rock and roll.

Despite skepticism from the music industry and the musical artists themselves, Nader sold out nearly all his concerts and produced a documentary film based on the concerts, Let the Good Times Roll (1973). His efforts led directly to oldies radio in the 1980s and proved the commercial value of nostalgia.

Artists featured at Nader concerts 

 Chuck Berry
 Willie Bobo
 Gary Bonds
 The Chantels
 Jimmy Clanton
 The Cleftones
 The Coasters
 Joe Cuba
 Danny and the Juniors
 Bo Diddley
 Dion and The Belmonts
 The Drifters
 The Flamingos
 Five Satins
 Bill Haley and the Comets
 The Harptones
 Brenda Lee
 Johnny Maestro of The Brooklyn Bridge
 The Moonglows
 Rick Nelson
 The Orlons
 Eddie Palmieri
 The Penguins
 The Platters
 Tito Puente
 Bobby Rydell
 Sha Na Na
 Shep and the Limelights
 The Shirelles
 The Supremes
 Little Anthony and the Imperials
 Ronnie Spector of The Ronettes
 The Skyliners
 The Del-Vikings

References

1940 births
2009 deaths
United States Army soldiers
American DJs